Extranormal (stylized ΞX+RΛNORMΛL El Origen [The Beginnings]) is a Mexican paranormal television program premiered on March 21, 2007, Samantha Arteaga presents the investigations carried out by Joe Herrera (and Alberto del Arco in past seasons), guided by paranormal specialists Octavio Elizondo (harmonizer and expert in metaphysics), Miriam Verdecía (harmonizer) and Luisa Cárdenas (medium and seer), and in previous seasons Laura Rivas (paranormal investigator and spiritualist), These investigations are carried out in Mexico and around the world.

History 

The original idea, the format design, the character roles and the conformation of the different seasons of the program is in charge of Jorge Omar Sánchez (current executive producer), the realization is in charge of Felipe Cendejas (General Producer).

Extranormal airs for the first time in the city of Guadalajara, Jalisco on March 21, 2007, weeks later it began broadcasting in several states of the Mexican Republic, Extranormal airs on the national network for all of Mexico on September 16, 2007.

On TV Azteca, Extranormal is the first program made in the interior of the Mexican Republic, by TV Azteca Jalisco and is broadcast nationally and internationally by Azteca América and Azteca Internacional.

From Azteca Trece to A Más 

A new season of EXN was planned to air in May 2014 and continue on Azteca 13 (today Azteca Uno), as it would bring a renewal to the program with investigations outside of Mexico, however it was not broadcast on Azteca Trece.

The program and the new seasons were broadcast in Azteca América but only in the United States.

On June 2, 2014, the broadcast of the seventh season, the "Extranormal Septium" which was broadcast every Monday on the official page of TV Azteca, some time later it also stopped broadcasting on the official page, it was only broadcast in Azteca America in the United States.

As the program is broadcast nationally in Mexico by A Más, which promotes programming produced by TV Azteca in Mexico, the program has enjoyed some popularity. At the end of 2020 and at the beginning of 2021, it was broadcast on Azteca 7 on fridays at 11:00 p.m.

Cast 

 Ivette Orozco: (2007–2010)
 Silvia Enciso: (2010–2012)
 Rosa María Martell "Rosy": (July 2012 – March 5, 2013)
 Alberto del Arco Ortiz: (2012–2014)
 : (2013–2014)
 Minerva Aponte: (2017)
 Vania Manzano: (March 3, 2019 – October 18, 2020).
 Samantha Arteaga: (January 24, 2021–present)

References

External links 

 
 

2007 Mexican television series debuts
2000s Mexican television series debuts
2000s Mexican television series
2010s Mexican television series
2020s Mexican television series
Television series by TV Azteca
Azteca Uno original programming
A Más original programming
Paranormal reality television series
Supernatural television series
UFO-related television